The Gregg Allman Tour is the first live album by Gregg Allman, released in 1974. It was recorded at Carnegie Hall and Capitol Theatre.  It peaked at number 50 on the Billboard Pop Albums charts in 1974. It was originally released as a double LP.

For this concert, Allman was backed by the band Cowboy, who played two of their own songs. Cowboy was a Capricorn Records label-mate and was Duane Allman's favorite band. Several of its members had already backed Gregg Allman on his debut album the previous year.

The Gregg Allman Tour was re-mastered and re-released on CD in 2001 by Polydor.

At the beginning of the album, Gregg Allman is introduced by Martin Mull.

Track listing

Side 1 

 "Don't Mess Up a Good Thing" (Oliver Sain) – 5:06
 "Queen of Hearts" (Gregg Allman) – 7:43
 "I Feel So Bad" (Chuck Willis) – 4:47

Side 2 

 "Stand Back" (Gregg Allman, Berry Oakley) – 3:32
 "Time Will Take Us" - Cowboy (Frank Thomas Talton) – 5:51
 "Where Can You Go?" - Cowboy (Frank Thomas Talton) – 8:10

Side 3 

 "Double Cross"  (Gregg Allman, Chuck Leavell) – 4:41
 "Dreams" (Gregg Allman) – 7:29
 "Are You Lonely for Me Baby" (Andy Cousin, Warne Livesey, Mark Price, Julianne Regan) – 4:27

Side 4 

 "Turn On Your Love Light" (Deadric Malone, Joseph Wade Scott) – 10:45
 "Oncoming Traffic" (Gregg Allman, Janice B. Allman) –  5:56
 "Will The Circle Be Unbroken" (Traditional)	– 7:21

Personnel
Gregg Allman - lead vocals, Hammond B-3 organ
Tommy Talton - lead & slide guitars
Scott Boyer - rhythm guitar
Ken Tibbetts - bass guitar
Bill Stewart - drums
Jai Johanny Johanson (credited as “Johnny Lee Johnson”) - conga drums & percussion
Chuck Leavell - acoustic & electric pianos
Randall Bramblett - soprano, alto & C-melody saxophones (all sax solos)
David Brown - tenor saxophone
Harold "Bullets" Williams - baritone saxophone
Todd Logan, Peter Eklund - trumpets
Annie Sutton, Erin Dickins, Lynn Rubin - backing vocals

Live Concert Artistic Staff
Lenny Cowles - Lighting Designer / Board Opp<ref>self<ref>

Cowboy (tracks 2 & 3, Side 2)
Tommy Talton - lead vocals, lead & slide guitars
Scott Boyer - harmony vocals, rhythm guitar
David Brown - bass guitar
Chuck Leavell - acoustic & electric pianos
Randall Bramblett - Hammond B-3 organ, soprano saxophone
Bill Stewart - drums
”Johnny Lee Johnson” - conga drums
Todd Logan, Peter Eklund - trumpets
"Bullet" Williams - baritone saxophone
Gregg Allman - Hammond B-3 organ ("Where Can You Go")

Production notes
Gregg Allman - Producer
Johnny Sandlin – Producer, Remixing
Sam Whiteside - Remixing
Randall Bramblett -  Horn Arranger
Ed Freeman - Horn & Strings Arranger
Strings under the direction of Max Cahn
Edd Kolakowski - piano technician 
George Marino - Mastering
Dennis M. Drake - Mastering on Compact Disc
Tom Flye & Tom Scott - Engineers
Al Clayton - Photographer

References

Gregg Allman albums
1974 live albums
Capricorn Records live albums
Albums recorded at Carnegie Hall